"Himna Kosovskih junaka", or in English "The Hymn of the Kosovo Heroes", written by Ljubomir Simović and composed by Dušan Karuović, is a song from historical war drama film Battle of Kosovo (1989). It was also the anthem of the Special Operations Unit (JSO).

See also
Vidovdan (song), 1989 patriotic song

References

Serbian folk songs
Serbian patriotic songs
1989 songs
Cultural depictions of Serbian men